The Right to Bare Arms is an album by American comedian Larry the Cable Guy, released on March 29, 2005 on Warner Music Nashville. It has been certified platinum by the RIAA. It was recorded live at the Verizon Wireless Theater (now Revention Music Center) in Houston, Texas on January 15 and 16, 2005.

As of 2014, sales in the United States have exceeded 960,000 copies, according to Nielsen SoundScan.

Track listing
All material written by Larry the Cable Guy.

"Git-R-Done!" – 1:20
"Midgets and Gay Bars" – 0:48
"WWJD" – 2:20
"Las Vegas" – 4:07
"Hank Williams Jr. High School" – 1:51
"Hooters and Hooters Airlines" – 4:38
"Dodge Truck, Retards and Stinkbait" – 1:49
"NASCAR" – 3:07
"The Right to Bare Arms!" – 4:07
"Family in Sanford" – 4:19
"Faith Healers and Weight Problems" – 4:02
"Romance and Imported Rubbers (I Seen This on TV... No Lie)" – 6:35
"Throwed Outta Penney's" – 1:01
"Shavin', Waxin', Primpin' and Shootin' Quail! (This Is Funny, I Don't Care Who Ya Are!)" – 3:24
"News Items" – 1:25
"Song for a Friend (And Other Things I Think About When I'm Hammered at 4 A.M.)" – 4:13
"Toddler Mail" – 7:04

Charts

Weekly charts

Year-end charts

Certifications

References

Larry the Cable Guy albums
2005 live albums
Warner Records live albums
2000s comedy albums
Live comedy albums
Spoken word albums by American artists